Van Zandt County Regional Airport  is a city-owned public airport in Wills Point, Van Zandt County, Texas, United States, located about  southeast of the central business district. The airport has no IATA or ICAO designation.

The facility was previously known as Wills Point Municipal Airport, but the name was changed following the late 2007 approval of a major airport improvement project.

The airport is used solely for general aviation purposes.

Facilities 

For the 12-month period ending 17 May 2016, the airport had 4,800 aircraft operations, an average of 13 per day, all general aviation. At that time, 14 aircraft were based at this airport, 86% single-engined and 14% helicopters, with no multiengined, ultralight, jet, or glider aircraft.

References

External links 
 Official Website
  at Texas DOT Airport Directory

Airports in Texas
Transportation in Van Zandt County, Texas